Jidou Ould Khaye El Moctar (born 8 July 1985 in Nouakchott, Mauritania) is a Mauritanian runner who competed at the 2012 Summer Olympics in the 200 m event. He was the flagbearer of Mauritania at the opening ceremony. El Moctar was eliminated in the first round but finished with a personal best time of 22.94 seconds.

He competed in the 100 m event at the 2016 Summer Olympics in Rio de Janeiro. He finished 6th in his heat during the preliminary round and did not qualify for the first round of the finals. He was the flagbearer for Mauritania during the Parade of Nations.

References 

1985 births
Living people
People from Nouakchott
Olympic athletes of Mauritania
Mauritanian male sprinters
Athletes (track and field) at the 2012 Summer Olympics
Athletes (track and field) at the 2016 Summer Olympics
World Athletics Championships athletes for Mauritania